In genetics, a subclade is a subgroup of a haplogroup.

Naming convention
Although human mitochondrial DNA (mtDNA) and Y chromosome DNA (Y-DNA) haplogroups and subclades are named in a similar manner, their names belong to completely separate systems.

mtDNA
mtDNA haplogroups are defined by the presence of a series of single-nucleotide polymorphism (SNP) markers in the hypervariable regions and the coding region of mitochondrial DNA. They are named with the capital letters A through Z, with further subclades named using numbers and lower case letters.

Y-DNA
Y-DNA haplogroups are defined by the presence of a series of SNP markers on the Y chromosome. Subclades are defined by a terminal SNP, the SNP furthest down in the Y chromosome phylogenetic tree.

Human Y-DNA
The Y Chromosome Consortium (YCC) developed a system of naming major human Y-DNA haplogroups with the capital letters A through T, with further subclades named using numbers and lower case letters (YCC longhand nomenclature). YCC shorthand nomenclature names Y-DNA haplogroups and their subclades with the first letter of the major Y-DNA haplogroup followed by a dash and the name of the defining terminal SNP. Y-DNA haplogroup nomenclature is changing over time to accommodate the increasing number of SNPs being discovered and tested, and the resulting expansion of the Y chromosome phylogenetic tree. This change in nomenclature has resulted in inconsistent nomenclature being used in different sources. This inconsistency, and increasingly cumbersome longhand nomenclature, has prompted a move towards using the simpler shorthand nomenclature.

See also
Clade
Cladistics
Haplotype

References

Genetics
Genetic genealogy